Oklahoma's Native Son is a 2005 bronze sculpture of Will Rogers by Harold T. Holden, installed outside the Will Rogers World Airport in Oklahoma City, in the U.S. state of Oklahoma. Commissioned by the Oklahoma City Airport Trust to commemorate the completion of the airport's terminal renovation project, the artwork depicts Rogers astride his horse Teddy and weighs 2,500 lbs.

See also

 2005 in art

References

2005 establishments in Oklahoma
2005 sculptures
Bronze sculptures in Oklahoma
Cultural depictions of Will Rogers
Equestrian statues in Oklahoma
Monuments and memorials in Oklahoma
Outdoor sculptures in Oklahoma City
Sculptures of men in Oklahoma